Karl William Kapp (October 27, 1910 – April 4, 1976) was a German-American economist and Professor of Economics at the City University of New York and later the University of Basel. Kapp's main contribution was the development of a theory of social costs that captures urgent socio-ecological problems and proposes preventative policies based on the precautionary principle. His theory is in the tradition of various heterodox economic paradigms, such as ecological economics, Marxian economics, social economics, and institutional economics. As such, Kapp's theory of social costs was an ongoing debate with neoclassical economics and the rise of neoliberalism. He was an opponent of the compartmentalization of knowledge and championed, instead, the integration and humanization of the social sciences.

Biography 
Kapp was born in Königsberg in 1910 as son of August Wilhelm Kapp, who was a teacher of physics. In secondary school at the Hufengymnasium one of his teachers was the poet Ernst Wiechert End 1920s he started studying law and economics at the universities in Berlin and Königsberg. He continued his studies in London and at the Graduate Institute of International Studies in Geneva, where in 1936 he received a Ph.D in economics with his dissertation „Planwirtschaft und Aussenhandel“.

In Geneva Kapp had met the people of the Frankfurt School, who emigrated to the US and settled as Institute for Social Research at the Columbia University, New York City. In 1937 they granted Kapp a scholarship. From 1938 to 1945 he was an instructor in Economics at the New York University and Columbia University in New York. From 1945 to 1950 he was Assistant Professor of Economics at the Wesleyan University in Middleton, Connecticut.

From 1950 to 1965 he was Professor of economics at the University of the City of New York. He was among the first members of the Association for Evolutionary Economics (AFEE). In 1965 he returned to Switzerland and was Professor of economics at the University of Basel until 1976. In that time he was also a Visiting Professor at the Ecole Pratique des Hautes Etudes, Sorbonne, Paris.

In 1976 Kapp suffered a fatal heart attack during a conference in Dubrovnik, Croatia.

Work 
Kapp's research interests ranged from economics, sociology, policy making and environmental science to the theory of knowledge, the history of economic thought, and many related topics.

Planning debate 
In his 1936 dissertation Planwirtschaft und Aussenhandel contributed to the debate around the economic calculation problem, a criticism of central economic planning. This problem was first proposed by Ludwig von Mises in 1920, expounded by Friedrich Hayek and further debated in the 1920s and 1930s. Kapp argued that a planned economy is "not doomed to autarky because there are ways to deal with the valuation problem so that trade and exchange with market economies can be organized".

Publications 
 1936, Planwirtschaft und Außenhandel, Genève : Georg & Cie. 
 1950, The Social Costs of Private Enterprise, Cambridge, Mass. : Harvard Univ. Press
 1963, The Social Costs of Business Enterprise
 1961, Towards a Science of Man in Society – A Positive Approach towards the Integration of Social Knowledge
 1958, Volkswirtschaftliche Kosten der Privatwirtschaft. Tübingen : Mohr (Siebeck).
 1975, Neue Wege für Bangladesh. Hamburg : Inst. f. Asienkunde
 1976, Staatliche Förderung "umweltfreundlicher" Technologien. Göttingen : Schwartz.
 2011, The Foundations of Institutional Economics – by K. William Kapp, edited by Sebastian Berger and Rolf Steppacher. Routledge.

See also 
 European Association for Evolutionary and Political Economy
 Non-equilibrium economics
 Vereinigung für Ökologische Ökonomie, that grants a research prize in remembrance of Kapp

References

Further reading 
 2017, Sebastian Berger, The Social Costs of Neoliberalism: Essays on the Economics of K. William Kapp. Nottingham: Spokesman.
 2015, Sebastian Berger (ed) The Heterodox Theory of Social Costs - by K. William Kapp. London: Routledge.
 2011, Julien-Francois Gerber/Rolf Steppacher (eds) "Towards an Integrated Paradigm in Heterodox Economics". Palgrave-Macmillan.
 2007, Eyup Ozveren (2007)"Where disciplinary boundaries blur"

External links 

 K. William Kapp Research Center

1910 births
1976 deaths
Writers from Königsberg
University of Königsberg alumni
Humboldt University of Berlin alumni
Graduate Institute of International and Development Studies alumni
German economists
Sustainability advocates
Wesleyan University faculty
Ecological economists
20th-century American economists
German emigrants to the United States